Centrocardita aculeata is a species of marine clams in the family Carditidae. It is found in the Mediterranean Sea and the European part of the North Atlantic Ocean.

References

External links 
 Centrocardita aculeata at the World Register of Marine Species (WoRMS)

Carditidae
Bivalves described in 1795
Taxa named by Giuseppe Saverio Poli